Burkville, is an unincorporated community in Lowndes County, Alabama, United States.

Geography

Gallery
Below are photographs taken in Burkville for the Historic American Buildings Survey:

References

Unincorporated communities in Alabama
Unincorporated communities in Lowndes County, Alabama